Eric Stuart is an American voice actor and musician who worked for 4Kids Entertainment, NYAV Post, and Central Park Media.

Early life
Stuart was born in Brooklyn, New York to a modern dancer mother and a criminal attorney father.

Voice acting career
He provides voices for English dubs of anime, cartoons, and video games. Some of his most prominent roles include Brock and James in Pokémon from seasons 1–8, Seto Kaiba in Yu-Gi-Oh!, and Gourry Gabriev in Slayers.

Music career
As a stage performer, he and his band, Eric Stuart Band, have toured with Peter Frampton (1999, 2000), Ringo Starr & His All-Starr Band (1997), Lynyrd Skynyrd (1997), and has opened for Jethro Tull (1997), Julian Cope (1995), Hall & Oates (1997, 1998) and Chicago (1995, 1997, 1998) as well.

Frampton produced his album Blue, Dressed in Black.

Filmography

Anime

Animation

Film

Video games

Web

Discography
 Curiosity (1996)
 Picture Perfect World (1997)
 Eric Stuart (1998)
 Blue, Dressed in Black (2000)
 BombShellShocked (2003)
 In The County Of Kings (2007)
 Empty Frame of Reference (2009)
 Falls on Me (2011)
 Lipstick and Barbed Wire (2013)
 My Kind of Danger (2018)

References

External links

 
 
 
 

Living people
American male video game actors
American male voice actors
American rock guitarists
American rock singers
American voice directors
Male actors from New York (state)
Male actors from Nashville, Tennessee
Musicians from Brooklyn
Musicians from Nashville, Tennessee
Saint Ann's School (Brooklyn) alumni
Singer-songwriters from New York (state)
Singer-songwriters from Tennessee
20th-century American male actors
21st-century American male actors
Year of birth missing (living people)